Sundaresta hilaris is a species of tephritid or fruit flies in the genus Sundaresta of the family Tephritidae.

Distribution
Indonesia.

References

Tephritinae
Insects described in 1953
Diptera of Asia